Colonial buildings in Medan include those that were constructed there during the colonial period of Dutch East Indies, now Indonesia. Following the establishment of the Deli Company in 1869, the city was transformed rapidly from a small kampong (village) of a few hundred people in 1869 into the largest city in Sumatra. When the Sultan of Deli moved his residence there in 1891, Medan became the capital of North Sumatra. Subsequent rapid development ushered in a western-centric architectural style used in a number of colonial buildings built in Medan. These buildings range from houses, offices, hotels, stores, houses of worship, hospitals, and schools. Despite its relatively late modernization compared to older established cities like Jakarta and Makassar, Medan has an abundant colonial architectural heritage. 42 buildings have been declared of significant historical value.

Urban planning

The urban center of Medan is divided into three areas: the colonial district, the Chinese district, and the sprawling native settlements. The colonial district is the core of the city and contains the most important government buildings and infrastructure. The shopping street in Kesawan, the military area between the Deli and the Babura Rivers, the affluent tropical garden city of Polonia, the central market, churches, hospitals, schools, factories, train station, and the airport are all in the colonial district. The Chinese district is a dense area on the eastern side of the Deli River, and intersects with the Colonial area in Kesawan. The sprawling Muslim native settlement is located around the Istana Maimun (1888), Istana Lama (late 19th-century, now demolished) and the Great Mosque (1907) at the southern end of the city next to the Kesawan business district and the Chinese area. The Dutch redesigned the main buildings in this largely Muslim area in an Orientalistic-Imperialist architectural style, an expression of the dominance of the colony's cultural and political control.

The development of Medan was closely linked to the city development on Penang Island, not just through its trading activities but also by its urban design and architecture. Wealthy residents of Medan and the colonial government hired British planners and British and Dutch architects from the Straits Settlements to be involved in the city planning and construction. The open plaza in the middle of colonial Medan was referred to as the "Esplanade", similar to the one in George Town. Shophouse (commercial/residential) building construction and facades mimic those found in the Straits Settlements. In Kesawan, the architectural style was a fusion of Dutch-British Tropical style. Unfortunately, many of these shophouses have been demolished.

In colonial Medan, junctions were designed as nodes, where the corner buildings were planned to have a unique facade or architectural elements facing the junction. These included towers, a rounded or oblique construction, or a set-back, giving each building a unique identity resulting in different urban nodes. One example of a surviving corner building is the AVROS building (now the BKS-PPS building) and the Medan warenhuis (department store) (now the mostly abandoned Angkatan Muda Pembaharuan Indonesia building). This urban design is similar to that in other Dutch colonial modern cities in the Indies e.g. Bandung, Semarang, and Malang.

List of buildings
Below is a list of colonial buildings found in Medan. The list is divided into the colonial architectural styles: Eclecticism (before 20th century), Dutch Rationalism and Traditionalism (1900s–1920s), and Modernism (1920s–1930s). The list is sorted alphabetically according to its official (local) name. The list can also be sorted by category.

Eclecticism (before 20th century)
Some of the first colonial buildings of Medan were concentrated around the "Esplanade" (now the Lapangan Merdeka), the station area, and around the Sultan's palace. Many of the first buildings were simple wooden structures, such as the hoofdkantoor van de Deli Maatschappij te Medan (The head office of the Deli Company in Medan), which during the time of its opening in 1870 was also used for a church, an administration building, a hospital and a feast hall, and the large wooden Old Sultan's Palace.

Rationalism and Traditionalism (1900s – 1920s)
New technological possibilities gradually transformed the architectural style used in Medan into a modern form. Two architectural movements appeared in the Netherlands and the Netherlands East Indies: Dutch Rationalism and Traditionalism.

The works of Hendrik Petrus Berlage were the main inspiration for Dutch Rationalism; the subsequent style in the tropical climate of Indonesia is known as the New Indies Style. The style is the result of an attempt to develop new solutions to integrate traditional precedents with new technological possibilities. The best example in Medan is the Medan Post Office, a fusion of Romanesque arch, traditional Dutch-styled gables, and new technology.

The Traditionalist movement appeared in the 1910s. It is basically the revival of the late 19th-century eclecticism, but was inspired mainly by classicism. The best examples in Medan are Bank Indonesia (the former Javasche Bank, 1909) and the old Medan City Hall (1909). Unlike earlier low-quality architecture, the new traditionalist movement made use of modern materials, for example reinforced concrete and steel frames behind its classical facade. The classical facades are mostly of natural stone. The monumental character of this style was popular for offices, warehouses and garages.

Modernism (1920s-1940s)
This period saw the emergence of Modernism and its varieties, namely Art Deco, Nieuwe Bouwen, Amsterdam School and other variations. Art Deco evolved from earlier Dutch Rationalism. The form is symmetrical and exudes technological progress and glamour, with rich colors and bold geometric shapes.

In the following period between the late 1930s and 1940s, Art Deco evolved into a new style known as Nieuwe Bouwen (the Dutch term for Modernism) or Functionalism. Instead of creating decorative styles on the facade, the architect creates style in the clear arrangement of space. These Nieuwe Bouwen buildings were less symmetrical and more expressive in form, using simple universal form such as cylinders or tubes, apparent in buildings such as the de Rex cinema building, now the Ria Restaurant (which was clumsily restored as an Art Deco style building) and the new building of the Medan railway station. Architect J.M. Groenewegen has made his mark on many of Medan's Nieuwe Bouwen buildings.

Medan also became the ground for the implementation of Amsterdam School-styled buildings not found in many parts of Indonesia. The St. Elizabeth's hospital (1929) by J.M. Groenewegen and the original plan of Centrale Pasar (destroyed in a fire) show the influence of the Amsterdam School.

Decline
Despite the abundance of Dutch colonial architectural heritage in Medan, colonial buildings are being demolished at an alarming speed. Non-governmental organizations claimed that almost 90 percent of the 42 protected buildings had either been demolished or modified, despite provincial ruling No. 6/1988 which bans the modification of these buildings. 73 buildings had not yet been protected, one example is the Mega Eltra building, constructed in 1912. It has since been demolished. Other heritage buildings that have been demolished are the Kerapatan building on Jl. Brig. Jen. Katamso, a bank building on Jl. Pemuda and the Public Works office on Jl. Listrik. The lack of city planning by the city's officials and the minimal awareness of history in Medan has caused many Medan colonial buildings to be demolished.

See also

Colonial architecture of Indonesia
Cultural heritage
History of Indonesia

References

Cited works

External links

Medan
Medan